St Kilda Beach may refer to:

St Kilda Beach, Victoria in Australia
The western half of Ocean Beach, Otago in New Zealand